The 2005 Swedish Golf Tour, titled as the 2005 Telia Tour for sponsorship reasons, was the 22nd season of the Swedish Golf Tour.

Most tournaments also featured on the 2005 Nordic Golf League.

Schedule
The following table lists official events during the 2005 season.

Order of Merit
The Order of Merit was based on prize money won during the season, calculated using a points-based system.

See also
2005 Danish Golf Tour
2005 Finnish Tour
2005 Swedish Golf Tour (women)

Notes

References

Swedish Golf Tour
Swedish Golf Tour